Paul Gerhard Natorp (24 January 1854 – 17 August 1924) was a German philosopher and educationalist, considered one of the co-founders of the Marburg school of neo-Kantianism. He was known as an authority on Plato.

Biography
Paul Natorp was born in Düsseldorf, the son of the Protestant minister Adelbert Natorp and his wife Emilie Keller. From 1871 he studied music, history, classical philology and philosophy in Berlin, Bonn and Strasbourg. He completed his doctoral dissertation in 1876 at the University of Strasbourg under the supervision of the philosopher Ernst Laas and in 1881 completed his Habilitation under the neo-Kantian Hermann Cohen. In 1885 he became extraordinary professor and in 1893 became ordinary professor in philosophy and pedagogy at Marburg University, a position he retained until his retirement in 1922. In the winter semester of 1923–24 Natorp conducted an intensive exchange of ideas with Martin Heidegger, who had been called to Marburg and whose work on Duns Scotus Natorp had read very early on.

In 1887 he married his cousin Helene Natorp; they had five children. Natorp was an ambitious composer, who wrote chiefly chamber music (including a cello sonata, a violin sonata, and a piano trio). He also wrote some 100 songs and two choral works. He conducted a correspondence with Johannes Brahms, who dissuaded him from becoming a professional composer.

He was an influence on the early work of Hans-Georg Gadamer and had a profound effect upon the thought of Edmund Husserl, the "father" of phenomenology. His students included the philosopher and historian Ernst Cassirer, the theologian Karl Barth and the author of Doctor Zhivago, Boris Pasternak.

Works
 Descartes' Erkenntnistheorie. Eine Studie zur Vorgeschichte des Kriticismus. 1882; 2014, 
 Sozialpädagogik (1899)
 Logik in Leitsätzen (1904)
 Gesammelte Abhandlungen zur Sozialpädagogik (3 volumes, 1907)
 Pestalozzi. Leben und Lehre (1909)
 Die logischen Grundlagen der exakten Wissenschaften (1910)
 Philosophie; ihr Problem und ihre Probleme (1911), new edition: Edition Ruprecht, Göttingen 2008 (ed. and introduction by Karl-Heinz Lembeck),  
 Sozialidealismus (1920)
 Beethoven und wir (1920)
 Platos Ideenlehre (1921); transl. 2004, Platos's Theory of Ideas: An Introduction to Idealism., Academia Verlag 
 Allgemeine Logik (in: Flach und Holzhey, Erkenntnistheorie und Logik im Neukantianismus, 1979)

Notes

References
 Judy Deane Saltzmann Paul Natorp's Philosophy of Religion within the Marburg Neo-Kantian Tradition (1980)
 Alexis Philonenko L'École de Marbourg : Cohen, Natorp, Cassirer (1989)
 Karl-Heinz Lembeck Platon in Marburg: Platon-Rezeption Und Philosophiegeschichtsphilosophie Bei Cohen Und Natorp (1994)
 Julien Servois Paul Natorp et la Théorie Platonicienne des Idées (2004)
 Norbert Jegelka Paul Natorp (1992)

External links
Stanford Encyclopedia of Philosophy page by Alan Kim

1854 births
1924 deaths
19th-century essayists
19th-century German composers
19th-century German educators
19th-century German historians
19th-century German male writers
19th-century German writers
19th-century German philosophers
20th-century essayists
20th-century German composers
20th-century German educators
20th-century German historians
20th-century German male writers
20th-century German philosophers
Continental philosophers
Descartes scholars
German composers
German educators
German logicians
German male essayists
German male non-fiction writers
German music historians
Historians of philosophy
Kant scholars
Kantian philosophers
Philosophers of art
Philosophers of culture
Philosophers of education
Philosophers of logic
Philosophers of religion
Philosophers of social science
Philosophy academics
Philosophy writers
Social philosophers
Academic staff of the University of Marburg
University of Strasbourg alumni
Writers from Düsseldorf